is the 4th single by Japanese idol girl group Keyakizaka46. It was released on 5 April 2017. It reached number-one on the weekly Oricon Singles Chart with 632,667 copies sold. It was also number-one on the Billboard Japan Hot 100. "Fukyōwaon" is a Japanese word that means "dissonance."

The center (choreography center) position in the title track is held by Yurina Hirate.

Track listing

Chart performance

Weekly
Oricon

Billboard Japan

Yearly
Billboard Japan

References

Further reading

External links 
 Discography on the official website of Keyakizaka46
 

2017 singles
2017 songs
J-pop songs
Japanese-language songs
Keyakizaka46 songs
Oricon Weekly number-one singles
Billboard Japan Hot 100 number-one singles
Sony Music Entertainment Japan singles
Song articles with missing songwriters